Ellen Mary Stawell-Brown (married name Ellen Hemsted) (1878–1958) was a British female badminton and tennis player. She has notably competed mainly in the All England Open Badminton Championships and Wimbledon Championships. Ellen Mary is the first woman ever to serve overarm in the Ladies' singles at the Wimbledon Championships.

Ellen Mary Stawell-Brown represented United Kingdom simultaneously in both international badminton competitions and Tennis competitions during the early 20th century (in 1900s). She competed at the Wimbledon Championships in 1901, 1902, 1903, 1904 and 1905.

Her notable achievement including the mixed doubles title victory along with F. S. Collier at the 1901 All England Badminton Championships. She also competed at the 1906 All England Badminton Championships.

Ellen's great grandson, Tim Henman is a popular retired tennis player. Her granddaughter, Jane Henman is also a tennis player who represents England in international level.

References 

1878 births
1958 deaths
English female badminton players
British female tennis players
Professional tennis players before the Open Era
Place of birth missing